The 1902 Missouri Tigers football team was an American football team that represented the University of Missouri as an independent during the 1902 college football season. The team compiled a 5-3 record and outscored its opponents by a combined total of 99 to 80. Pat O'Dea was the head coach for the first and only season. The team played its home games at Rollins Field in Columbia, Missouri.

Schedule

References

Missouri
Missouri Tigers football seasons
Missouri Tigers football